Dave Tinelt is a heavy metal music vocalist with Mortal Sin and Nekrofeist.

Tinelt was born in Port Kembla, New South Wales (born 1974) and grew up in the Wollongong suburb of Bellambi. Tinelt knew he wanted to be in a metal band when he was 12–13 years old. He joined his first metal band Stentorian as the drummer.

In March 2012, Tinelt was announced as the new lead singer of Mortal Sin. and fronted the band for a number of gigs before it broke up.

References

External links
 www.metalobsession.net/2017/06/22/dave-tinelt-ex-mortal-sin-joins-thrash-metallers-metreya/
 
 
 https://www.abc.net.au/radio/programs/speakingout/half-hour-of-black-power-wollongong-metal-band-nekrofeist/7453884
 http://globalthrashassault.com/?p=573
 https://books.google.com.au/books?id=QK3JCQAAQBAJ&pg=PA2199&lpg=PA2199&dq="Dave+Tinelt"&source=bl&ots=Y_CJP4IIHM&sig=I8i-q2-nQjxyJUKSvsvDbdIdgo8&hl=en&sa=X&ved=2ahUKEwjG7Y7MvI_fAhXQbX0KHZF-Cgc4FBDoATAAegQIABAB#v=onepage&q="Dave%20Tinelt"&f=false
 http://www.radiometal.com/article/mortal-sin-dave-tinelt-nekrofeist-est-le-nouveau-chanteur-du-groupe,60517
 http://www.todoheavymetal.com/index.php/tag/dave-tinelt-mortal-sin-todohevymetal-com
 https://www.ultimate-guitar.com/news/upcoming_releases/mortal_sin_start_work_on_new_album.html

Australian male singers
People from New South Wales
Black metal musicians